CEFC China Energy was a Chinese conglomerate. The company was among the 10 largest private companies in China in 2014. In 2017, the company was listed as 222 on the Fortune Global 500. In March 2020, the company -- along with its subsidiaries CEFC Shanghai International and CEFC Hainan International -- was declared bankrupt. The company used a complex web of affiliated companies to facilitate fake deals, inflate trade figures, and obtain bank loans to fuel its aggressive expansion.

Industries
In 2014, the company generated revenue mainly from oil and gas (60%) and financial services (25%). It also operated  in a wide range of other sectors like transport infrastructure, forestry, asset management, hotel management, warehousing services, real estate development and logistics services. A large portion of CEFC's assets were concentrated in overseas markets.

Controlling shareholder
The controlling shareholder was Shanghai Energy Fund Investment Ltd (SEFI), which was registered under Ye Jianming, the chairman of CEFC. In January 2017, Czech President Miloš Zeman appointed Ye as his economic adviser.

In a 2017 piece on Ye, the South China Morning Post repeated rumors that had appeared in Czech news media that Ye is linked to the People's Liberation Army and noted "speculation runs wild."

In March 2018, Ye was detained for questioning on suspicion of economic crimes. South China Morning Post reported that ", a portfolio and investment agency controlled by Shanghai’s municipal government, had taken control of CEFC China Energy". The state controlled CITIC Group acquired 49% of CEFC Shanghai, a subsidiary of CEFC China Energy. CEFC Shanghai owned CEFC Europe. In April 2018, CEFC announced possible layoffs of 15,000 employees, who had not been paid for two months.

Czech investments
In May 2015, the company acquired a 5% stake in J&T Finance Group. This increased to 9.9% in September 2015. In 2017, the company applied to acquire 50% J&T Finance Group, but the deal was refused by Czech National Bank because of lack of sufficient information on the origin of most of the funding for the deal.

In September 2015, the company acquired multiple assets in the Czech Republic - a majority stake in brewery , a 10% stake in airline Travel Service, 60% in football club SK Slavia Prague and real-estate assets in Prague - the building of the former Živnostenská banka at Na příkopě street and Le Palais Art Hotel Prague. CEFC also bought a stake of between 50 and 90 per cent in Czech online travel agent Invia in March 2016, probably with a view to capitalising on the rapidly increasing numbers of Chinese tourists visiting Prague.

After CEFC China Energy invested in Czech media company Empresa Media, the owner of the popular TV Barrandov and magazine Týden, the tone of the group’s coverage of China changed; all neutral and negative reporting about China was replaced by positive reporting.

Failed Rosneft acquisition
In September 2017, CEFC announced the purchase of a 14.16% stake in Rosneft, Russia's largest oil producer, for about $9 billion. However, CEFC was unable complete the acquisition and paid a break fee of about $257 million to the sellers, a consortium of Qatar Investment Authority and Glencore.

2018 default
In May 2018, CITIC Group announced they would repay 450 million Euros owed by CEFC Europe to finance and banking group J&T within days, but since the debt was not paid a week later, J&T announced it had taken over shareholder rights and installed crisis management at CEFC Europe. Several days later, CEFC Shanghai defaulted on $327 million in bond payments, and offered to make the payments six months after the maturity date.

In October 2020, some retail CEFC bondholders in Hong Kong filed a complaint to the Securities and Futures Commission in Hong Kong against the bond's sole underwriter CITIC CLSA.

References

Privately held companies of China
Conglomerate companies of China
Companies based in Shanghai